"Mirage" is a song by the Italian Italo disco band Scotch.

Background 

"Mirage" was co-written by singers Vince Lancini and Fabio Margutti and producer David Zambelli.

Track listing 

 Italian 7-inch single

A. "Mirage" – 3:55
B. "Amor Por Victoria" – 4:30

 German 12-inch maxi single

A. "Mirage" – 5:02
B1. "Amor Por Victoria" – 4:49
B2. "Mirage (German Version)" – 4:57

Personnel 

Scotch

 Vince Lancini – lead and harmony vocals
 Fabio Margutti – keyboards

Charts

Weekly charts

References

External links 

 

1986 songs
1986 singles
Scotch (band) songs
ZYX Music singles